Josh Neiswander (born December 2, 1986) is a former professional Canadian football quarterback and current American football coach. He was signed by the Montreal Alouettes on June 11, 2011. He dressed in all 17 games during the following season as a backup to Anthony Calvillo, football's all-time leader in passing yards, touchdowns, and completions. He started his first professional game against the BC Lions on August 22, 2013, and started 4 more games that season, throwing for 1,369 yards and 9 touchdowns in his first professional season. He graduated with a Master's in Business Administration from Angelo State University while breaking every major passing record in school history.

Neiswander became the quarterbacks coach for the Tampa Bay Vipers of the XFL in 2019, which reunited him with Montreal head coach Marc Trestman.

References

External links
Alouettes biography

1986 births
Living people
People from Winnsboro, Texas
Players of American football from Texas
American football quarterbacks
Canadian football quarterbacks
American players of Canadian football
Angelo State Rams football players
Montreal Alouettes players
Tampa Bay Vipers coaches